Anguillavus is an extinct genus of prehistoric ray-finned fish that lived during the upper Cenomanian of Lebanon and the United States. It was originally described as a primitive eel that still had pelvic fins, unlike modern eels. In 1981, the holotype of A. hackberryensis, from Cenomanian-aged marine strata in Kansas, was reexamined, whereupon the genus was then redescribed as a genus of dercertid aulopiform fish. However G. David Johnson (2011) cites several studies which refute it (Patterson 1993; Y. Lu 1994, A. Belouze 2002 and 2003).

The 2015 article 'Phylogenetic analysis of molecular and morphological data highlights uncertainty in the relationships of fossil and living species of Elopomorpha (Actinopterygii: Teleostei)' also lists Angullavis (take note of the different spelling) as a stem anguilliformes.

References

Aulopiformes
Prehistoric ray-finned fish genera
Late Cretaceous fish of North America
Late Cretaceous fish of Asia